No Greater Love or Heart of the World is a 1952 West German historical drama film directed by Harald Braun. It was entered into the 1952 Cannes Film Festival. It was shot at the Bavaria Studios in Munich and on location in Berlin. The film's sets were designed by the art directors Hermann Warm and Robert Herlth.

Cast
 Hilde Krahl as Bertha von Suttner
 Dieter Borsche as Arthur von Suttner
 Werner Hinz as Basil Zaharoff
 Mathias Wieman as Dr. Alfred Nobel
 Käthe Haack as Baronin von Suttner
 Dorothea Wieck as Therese von Gobat
 Therese Giehse as Female train passenger
 Paul Bildt as Fehrenbach
 Heinrich Gretler as Graf Fürstenberg
 Paul Henckels as Professor Gutgesell
 Erich Ponto as Minister
 Alfred Neugebauer as Baron von Suttner
 Wolfgang Liebeneiner as Chef editor

See also
Notable film portrayals of Nobel laureates

References

External links

1952 films
1950s historical drama films
1950s biographical drama films
German historical drama films
German biographical drama films
West German films
1950s German-language films
German black-and-white films
Films directed by Harald Braun
Films about Nobel laureates
Films set in the 1870s
Films set in the 1880s
Films set in the 1890s
Films set in the 1900s
Films set in the 1910s
Films shot at Bavaria Studios
1952 drama films
1950s German films